The 1997 World Table Tennis Championships women's doubles was the 43rd edition of the women's doubles championship.
Deng Yaping and Yang Ying defeated Li Ju and Wang Nan in the final by three sets to two.

Results

See also
List of World Table Tennis Championships medalists

References

-
World